Stillwater is an unincorporated community in eastern Rush Township, Tuscarawas County, Ohio, United States.  It has a post office with the ZIP code 44679.  It lies at the intersection of State Routes 258 and 800.

History
Stillwater was originally called Lima. A post office called Stillwater has been in operation since 1837.

References

Unincorporated communities in Ohio
Unincorporated communities in Tuscarawas County, Ohio